This is an alphabetical list of cricketers who have played for Southern Vipers since their founding in 2016. They first played in the Women's Cricket Super League, a Twenty20 competition, that ran from 2016 to 2019. After a restructure of English women's domestic cricket in 2020, they now compete in the 50 over Rachael Heyhoe Flint Trophy and the Twenty20 Charlotte Edwards Cup.

Players' names are followed by the years in which they were active as a Southern Vipers player. Seasons given are first and last seasons; the player did not necessarily play in all the intervening seasons. Current players are shown as active to the latest season in which they played for the club. This list only includes players who appeared in at least one match for Southern Vipers; players who were named in the team's squad for a season but did not play a match are not included.

A
 Georgia Adams (2016–2022)

B
 Suzie Bates (2016–2019)
 Tammy Beaumont (2018–2019)
 Lauren Bell (2018–2022)
 Maia Bouchier (2018–2022)
 Arran Brindle (2016–2018)
 Thea Brookes (2019)

C
 Ella Chandler (2020–2021)
 Isabelle Collis (2016)
 Providence Cowdrill (2020)
 Charlie Dean (2017–2022)

D
 Mignon du Preez (2017–2018)

E
 Charlotte Edwards (2016–2017)
 Georgia Elwiss (2021–2022)

F
 Tash Farrant (2016–2019)

G
 Katie George (2016–2018)
 Chiara Green (2021)
 Lydia Greenway (2016)

H
 Nancy Harman (2022)
 Chloe Hill (2022)

K
 Marie Kelly (2019)
 Freya Kemp (2022)
 Amelia Kerr (2018)

L
 Gaby Lewis (2021)

M
 Ella McCaughan (2020–2022)
 Sara McGlashan (2016–2018)
 Alice Macleod (2016)
 Hayley Matthews (2017)
 Sophie Mitchelmore (2021)
 Alice Monaghan (2020–2022)
 Fi Morris (2016–2019)

N
 Morna Nielsen (2016)
 Tara Norris (2017–2022)

R
 Carla Rudd (2016–2022)

S
 Paige Scholfield (2018–2022)
 Anya Shrubsole (2022)
 Linsey Smith (2016–2017)

T
 Charlotte Taylor (2020–2022)
 Mary Taylor (2022)
 Stafanie Taylor (2019)
 Finty Trussler (2022)

W
 Amanda-Jade Wellington (2019)
 Emily Windsor (2020–2022)
 Issy Wong (2019)
 Danni Wyatt (2017–2022)

Captains

References

Southern Vipers